The 2018 New England Revolution season is the team's 23rd season of existence, and their 23rd season in Major League Soccer, the top-flight of American soccer.

Current squad
As of June 12, 2018.  Source: New England Revolution Roster

Staff

Out 

|-

|-

|-

|-

|-

|-

|-

|-

|-

On Loan 

|-

|-

|-

|-

Player statistics

Top scorers

As of October 2, 2018

Disciplinary record

As of June 9, 2018

References

New England Revolution seasons
New England Revolution
New England Revolution
New England Revolution
Sports competitions in Foxborough, Massachusetts